Batman: The Knight is an American comic book published by DC Comics. The 10-issue limited series, written by Chip Zdarsky and illustrated by Carmine Di Giandomenico, began publication on January 18, 2022.

Publication 
Batman: The Knight was written by Chip Zdarsky and illustrated by Carmine Di Giandomenico, with colors by Ivan Plascencia and lettered by Pat Brosseau. The ten issues of Batman: The Knight are released by DC Comics at monthly intervals, with the first being published on January 18, 2022. The limited series was released to critical acclaim, with. critics praising Chip Zdarsky's story, artwork, and action.

Plot 
Bruce Wayne meets up with Hugo Strange to talk about his troubled past where Bruce would fight off bullies that would pick on his classmates. Alfred Pennyworth is annoyed by this and forces Bruce to read books to study in order to control his anger and rage from his parents' death. While talking to his girlfriend Dana, Bruce reveals he wants to be a cop, but Dana laughs and tells Bruce that the only reason why he wants to be a cop is because of vengeance.  As time goes by, Bruce does not attend his classes because he does not see them as important anymore, and has been participating in underground fighting clubs. Bruce is arrested and Alfred bails him out while belittling him on his path of vengeance. Bruce finishes his therapy session while also noticing Hugo Strange has been trying to hypnotize him to steal money and calls the cops to arrest Hugo Strange while declaring that he will leave Gotham City to find his own path.

Four weeks later, Bruce Wayne is in Paris trying to find a teacher that can teach him stealth without telling Alfred as well as finding a serial killer. He meets a female burglar name Lucie who agrees to teach him after admiring his dedication and wanting Bruce to capture all of her competition in the future. After a few weeks, Lucie tells Bruce they will steal from Chateau Merchand to steal a $4 million dollar jewelry box from Hubert Glonet, the CEO of Sunrise Oil. While escaping, Bruce is shot in the leg but Lucie helps him escape. While tending to his wounds, Henri Ducard arrives and holds Bruce and Lucie at gunpoint.

Henri Ducard decides to let Bruce Wayne and Lucie go after revealing Alfred hired him to find Bruce and Lucie has brokered a truce with Ducard. Henri Ducard realizes that Bruce and Lucie stole the jewelry box from Hubert Glonet, who is the serial killer. Henri Ducard explains that Hubert Glonet is part of The Foundling, serial killers targeting wealthy families. Henri Ducard decides to draw out Hubert Glonet out, but in the ensuing chaos due to Bruce Wayne exposing them, Henri Ducard is shot. Bruce manages to figure out Hubert Glonet's final target, but arrives too late to save him. Hubert tries killing Bruce, but Bruce overpowers Hubert and nearly beats him to death. Lucie stops him and fires him, but not before parting on good terms. Bruce calls Alfred, saying he regrets their last conversation but he will not come back until he finds his own path.

Bruce Wayne goes to Paektu Mountain in North Korea to ask for training from Master Kirigi. Bruce bonds with a young man name Anton and they start training for months. Bruce becomes suspicious after Master Kirigi takes in new students without any previous tests. While talking with Anton, Anton tells Bruce that he wants to stop crime for fun and that it is harder than committing crimes.  Bruce Wayne decides to leave Master Kirigi's training after Master Kirigi plans to teach the students a technique that will kill people in one hit, as well as the new students being assassin's apprentices. Bruce is ambushed by Master Kirigi's new apprentices (who Anton told them that Bruce was leaving) before being saved by Anton, and both of them begin traveling elsewhere.

Bruce and Anton are arrested after they were caught staking an FBI office in Moscow trying to find Avery Oblonsky and are imprisoned for 13 days. Their jail cells are suddenly unlocked one night and it is revealed that Avery Oblonsky was the jail warden who imprisoned them as well as Alexi Yahonotov, Department Chief in the FSB. Bruce Wayne and Anton explain they want to find Avery Oblonsky to understand the art of espionage and disguise. After some training, Avery tells Bruce and Anton to free two people who were arrested in Metropolis for drug use. Bruce nearly fails the task, but Anton completes the assignment by bribing the officials. For their next assignment, Avery has them retrieve a book that has Russian safe houses from an embassy. Bruce nearly fails the mission, but Anton gets the book and gives it to Avery.

Avery Oblonsky sends Bruce and Anton to be trained by Luka Jungo, the world's greatest marksman. Luka Jungo explained he left the Swiss Army because he was forced to kill his target's family. One day, Luka is enraged that Anton shot a deer in the neck which caused it to die in pain, and plans to kill Anton. Bruce disarms Anton with a shot to the wrist, but Anton shoots Luka in the head, killing him. Bruce and Anton fight, with Anton defeating Bruce but deciding to spare him.

Bruce travels to New York City where he gets training from John Zatara on how to escape. Zatara wants his daughter Zatanna to follow in his footsteps, but Zatanna does not like how her father is an alcoholic. While walking with Bruce, they find a corpse that has red markings, and see that Zatara was talking to a demon name Shantoz. Bruce asks Zatara to teach him magic so he can stop the killings but Zatara declines; instead, Bruce asks Zatanna to help him. Bruce and Zatanna manage to lure Shantoz in a trap, and Zatara sends him back to Hell.

While training in Rio de Janeiro, Mexico, and Shanghai Bruce realizes that Anton has been sabotaging him during missions to make sure Bruce knows he is one step ahead of him. Bruce meets up with a new teacher name Daniel Captio to control his fear and emotions. Bruce fails to control his emotions and plans to leave Daniel Captio when Daniel shows Bruce a picture of Alfred and Dana shot in the head, enraging Bruce. Anton appears wounded, telling Bruce he was not the one sabotaging him during missions but a swordsman named Harris Zuma. Bruce defeats Harris Zuma but spare him, and in return Harris Zuma reveals he was the teacher of the Master Kirigi's new apprentices and tells Bruce that Ra's al Ghul is waiting for Anton and Bruce. Bruce comes back and confronts Daniel Captio, realizing that he manipulated the picture of Alfred and Dana to see if Bruce can focus his emotion at a goal which works. Bruce knocks out Daniel Captio, and both Bruce and Anton go to the Crystal Hills of Abu Dhabi to meet up with Ra's Al Ghul.

While traveling, Bruce and Anton's jeep are sabotaged and they walk on foot to meet Ra's al Ghul. Ra's al Ghul explains that he's trying to save the world as well, and agrees to train them in the heart of healing wounds. Bruce is suspicious of Ra's al Ghul as, even though he is saying he is saving the world, he is also training assassins. While sparring with Ra's al Ghul, Bruce is easily defeated and wounded. Bruce survives by slowing his heart rate and use Bialyan graveolens to disinfect and enhance regeneration. Talia al Ghul makes advances on Bruce, but Bruce rejects her and she leaves coldly. Ra's al Ghul calls them to a meeting, saying that he has assassins to protect himself, as well as him reaching out for Anton and Bruce to replace Harris Zuma, and tells Bruce and Anton they will have to fight for the death.

Bruce defeats Anton, and becomes Ra's Al Ghul right-hand man, and he and Talia kiss. Ra's al Ghul explains that, in order to bring peace in the world, there needs to be violence to force people to be peaceful, which is why he has misses which will attack innocent cities. Bruce reveals that Anton found out about the missiles, and blows them up. Bruce defeats Ra's al Ghul in combat, but is stabbed in the back by Talia al Ghul, who takes Ra's al Ghul. Anton saves Bruce and leaves him out in the desert. Bruce returns back to Gotham City and reconciles with Alfred and learns that Dana is engaged to a firefighter and works at Lexcorp.

Issues

Reception 
Reviewing the first issue of Batman: The Knight, Sayantan Gayen of Comic Book Resources commented "Bruce Wayne follows a path of self-discovery, reconciliation, and vengeance. While it seems like DC Comics is currently running a plethora of Batman titles and crossovers across the board, Batman: The Knight #1 looks to bring more color and dimension to Gotham's wealthiest kid". At the end of his analysis, Gayen wrote: "Chip Zdarsky uses the debut issue of Batman: The Knight to propel Bruce Wayne on a lengthy trial to strengthen his mind, soul, and body.".

According to Comicscored.com, the series received generally favorable ratings, with a Comicscore Index of 75 based on 114 ratings from critics.

According to Comicbookroundup, the series received an average rating of 8.6 out of 10 based on 99 reviews.

References 

2022 in comics
American comics
Batman storylines
Batman titles
Comic book limited series
Comics publications
DC Comics limited series
DC Comics titles
Neo-noir comics
Superhero comics